Neerja is a 2016 Indian Hindi-language biographical thriller film directed by Ram Madhvani and produced by Atul Kasbekar. The film stars Sonam Kapoor as Neerja Bhanot and features Shekhar Ravjiani, Shabana Azmi and Yogendra Tiku among others in supporting roles. The film's script and screenplay were penned by Saiwyn Quadras, the dialogue was written by Sanyuktha Chawla Sheikh, and the editing was handled by Monisha R Baldawa. Set in Karachi, the plot of Neerja centres on the Libyan-backed Abu Nidal Organization's hijacking of Pan Am Flight 73 in Karachi, Pakistan, on 5 September 1986. The film is shown from the point of view of the flight's head purser, Neerja Bhanot, who died saving passengers on the hijacked flight.

Made on a budget of ₹200 million (US$3.1 million), Neerja was released on 19 February 2016, and grossed  worldwide. The film won 31 awards from 45 nominations; its direction and performances of the cast members have received the most attention from award groups.

The film won two awards at the 64th ceremony of India's National Film Awards—Best Feature Film in Hindi and Special Mention for Kapoor. At the 62nd Filmfare Awards, Neerja won five awards, including Best Film (Critics) and Best Actress (Critics); the film was also nominated for Best Director and Best Film. At the 2016 Screen Awards, it received nomination for Best Actress, and won four awards, including Best Director. Neerja won four awards at the 18th ceremony of the International Indian Film Academy Awards, including Best Film and Best Supporting Actress; it also garnered three nominations, including Best Director and Best Actress. At the 2017 Zee Cine Awards, the film won awards in seven categories, including Best Director and Best Supporting Actress.

Accolades

See also 
 List of Bollywood films of 2016

Notes

References

External links 
 Accolades for Neerja at the Internet Movie Database

Lists of accolades by Indian film